Yevgeni Olegovich Bashkirov (born 6 July 1991) is a Russian professional footballer who plays as a defensive and central midfielder.

Career
Bashkirov is a graduate of the Zenit football academy. He then played at Zenit Saint Petersburg youth team.

He made his professional debut for FC Tom Tomsk on 26 September 2012 in the Russian Cup game against PFC CSKA Moscow.

On 31 January 2019, he signed a 1.5-year contract with Rubin Kazan. On 24 February 2020, his contract with Rubin was terminated by mutual consent.

On 26 February 2020, he signed with Polish club Zagłębie Lubin until the end of June 2020 with an extension option. Having made no appearances since September 2021 due to injuries, and with less than three months left on his contract, Bashkirov left Zagłębie by mutual consent on 12 April 2022.

References

External links
 Player page on the official FC Tom Tomsk website 
 

1991 births
Footballers from Saint Petersburg
Living people
Russian footballers
Russia youth international footballers
Association football midfielders
FC Zenit Saint Petersburg players
FC Tom Tomsk players
PFC Krylia Sovetov Samara players
FC Rubin Kazan players
Zagłębie Lubin players
Russian Premier League players
Ekstraklasa players
Russian expatriate footballers
Expatriate footballers in Poland
Russian expatriate sportspeople in Poland